James Houston Davis (September 11, 1899 – November 5, 2000) was an American singer, songwriter, and politician. After achieving fame for releasing both sacred and popular songs, Davis served as governor of Louisiana from 1944 to 1948 and again from 1960 to 1964. As Governor, Davis was an opponent of efforts to desegregate Louisiana.

Davis was a nationally popular country music and gospel singer from the 1930s into the 1960s, occasionally recording and performing as late as the early 1990s. He appeared as himself in a number of Hollywood movies. He was inducted into six halls of fame, including the Country Music Hall of Fame, the Southern Gospel Music Association Hall of Fame, and the Louisiana Music Hall of Fame. At the time of his death in 2000, he was the oldest living former governor as well as the last living governor to have been born in the 19th century.

Early life and career

Childhood and birth date confusion 
Davis was born to a sharecropping couple, the former Sarah Elizabeth Works (1877–1965) and Samuel Jones Davis (1873–1945), in Beech Springs, southeast of Quitman in Jackson Parish, north Louisiana. It is now a ghost town. The family was so poor that young Jimmie did not have a bed in which to sleep until he was nine years old.

Davis was not sure of his date of birth; according to The New York Times, "Various newspaper and magazine articles over the last 70 years said he was born in 1899, 1901, 1902 or 1903. He told The New York Times several years ago that his sharecropper parents could never recall just when he was born – he was, after all, one of 11 children – and that he had not had the slightest idea when it really was." The birth date listed on his Country Music Hall of Fame plaque is September 11, 1902. The 1900 US Census recorded his birth as September 1899, which his parents would have told the census taker.

Education 
Davis graduated from Beech Springs High School and from Soule Business College, in New Orleans. Davis received his bachelor's degree in history from the Baptist-affiliated Louisiana College in Pineville in Rapides Parish. He received a master's degree from Louisiana State University in Baton Rouge.

His 1927 master's thesis, which examines the intelligence levels of different races, is titled Comparative Intelligence of Whites, Blacks and Mulattoes.

Career beginnings 
During the late 1920s, Davis taught history (and, unofficially, yodeling) for a year at the former Dodd College for Girls in Shreveport. The college president, Monroe E. Dodd, who was also the pastor of First Baptist Church of Shreveport and a radio preacher, invited Davis to serve on the faculty.

Musical career
Davis became a commercially successful singer of rural music before he entered politics. His early work was in the style of country music singer Jimmie Rodgers. Davis was also known for recording energetic and raunchy blues tunes, such as "Red Nightgown Blues" and "Tom Cat and Pussy Blues". Some of these records included slide guitar accompaniment by black bluesman Oscar "Buddy" Woods. During his first run for governor, opponents reprinted the lyrics of some of these songs in order to undermine Davis's campaign. In one case, anti-Davis forces played some records over an outdoor sound system, only to give up after the crowds started dancing, ignoring the double-entendre lyrics. Until the end of his life, Davis never denied or repudiated those records.

In 1999, "You Are My Sunshine" was honored with a Grammy Hall of Fame Award, and the Recording Industry Association of America named it one of the Songs of the Century. "You Are My Sunshine" was ranked in 2003 as No. 73 on CMT's 100 Greatest Songs in Country Music. Until his death, Davis insisted that he wrote the song. Virginia Shehee, a Shreveport businesswoman, philanthropist, and state senator, introduced legislation to designate "You Are My Sunshine" as the official state song. The song was reportedly written for Elizabeth Selby, a resident of Urbana, Illinois and housemother of Wescoga ("Wesley Co-Op for Gals") at the time the song was written.

Davis often performed during his campaign stops when running for governor of Louisiana. After being elected in 1944, he became known as the "singing governor." While governor, he had a No. 1 hit single in 1945 with "There's a New Moon Over My Shoulder". Davis recorded for the Victor Talking Machine Company, and Decca Records for decades and released more than 40 albums.

A long-time Southern Baptist, Davis recorded a number of Southern gospel albums. In 1967 he served as president of the Gospel Music Association. He was a close friend of the North Dakota-born band leader Lawrence Welk, who frequently reminded viewers of his television program of his association with Davis.

A number of his songs were used as part of motion picture soundtracks. Davis appeared in half a dozen films, including one starring Ozzie and Harriet, who had a TV series under their names. Members of Davis's last band included Allen "Puddler" Harris of Lake Charles. He had served as pianist for singer Ricky Nelson early in his career.

Davis was also a close acquaintance of the country singer-songwriter Hank Williams, with whom he co-wrote the top-10 hit "(I Heard That) Lonesome Whistle" in 1951, supposedly on a fishing day they spent together.

Singles

Political career

Davis was elected in 1938 as Shreveport's public safety commissioner. At the time, Shreveport had the city commission form of government. After four years in Shreveport City Hall, Davis was elected in 1942 to the Louisiana Public Service Commission. The rate-making body meets in the capital, Baton Rouge. He was elected during his term as governor and left after two years.

First term as governor (1944–1948)

Davis was elected governor as a Democrat in 1944. Among those eliminated in the primary were State Senator Ernest S. Clements of Oberlin in Allen Parish, freshman U.S. Representative James H. Morrison of Hammond in Tangipahoa Parish, and Sam Caldwell, the mayor of Shreveport. Davis and Caldwell had served together earlier in Shreveport municipal government.

In the runoff, Davis defeated Lewis L. Morgan, an elderly attorney and former U.S. representative from Covington, the seat of St. Tammany Parish, who had been backed by former Governor Earl Kemp Long and New Orleans Mayor Robert Maestri. In the runoff, Davis received 251,228 (53.6 percent) to Morgan's 217,915 (46.4 percent).

Davis recruited Chris Faser Jr., a young staff member of the Public Service Commission, to manage his gubernatorial race and act as his chief of staff. Faser became the "go-to" guy to obtain access to the governor.

Davis pleased white liberals with his appointments to high positions of two of the leaders of the impeachment effort against Huey Long. He named Cecil Morgan of Shreveport to the Louisiana Civil Service Commission. Morgan was succeeded in the Louisiana House by Rupert Peyton of Shreveport, who also served as an aide to Davis. In addition, Davis retained the anti-Long Ralph Norman Bauer of St. Mary Parish as House speaker, a selection made originally in 1940 by Sam Jones.

Davis reached out to the Longites when he commuted the prison sentence imposed on former LSU President James Monroe Smith, convicted in the Louisiana Hayride scandals of the late 1930s. Like Davis, Smith was a native of Jackson Parish.

Earl Long was seeking the lieutenant governorship on the Lewis Morgan "ticket" and led in the first primary in 1944, but he lost the runoff to J. Emile Verret of New Iberia, then the president of the Iberia Parish School Board.

Davis kept his hand in show business, and set a record for absenteeism during his first term. He made numerous trips to Hollywood to make Western "horse operas."

Under the term limit provision of the state constitution then in effect, Davis was limited to a single non-consecutive term in office.

The election of 1959–1960

When he became a candidate for a second term in 1959–60, Davis had been out of office for nearly a dozen years. In a later study of this election, three Louisiana State University political scientists described him by the following:

Davis has all the external attributes of a "man of the people", but his serious political connections seem to be with the [parish-seat] elite and its allies, particularly the major industrial combinations of the state. He is in many respects a toned-down version of the old-style southern politician who could spellbound the mass of voters into supporting him regardless of the effects of his programs on their welfare. ... Davis creates the perfect image of a man to be trusted and one whose intense calm is calculated to bring rational balance into the political life of the state.

Davis was running at a time when African Americans in the civil rights movement were seeking social justice and restoration of their constitutional rights. In 1954 the US Supreme Court had ruled in Brown v. Board of Education that segregation in public schools was unconstitutional and urged states to integrate their facilities. With a pledge to fight for continued segregation in public education, Davis won the Democratic gubernatorial nomination over a crowded field.

It included fellow segregationist State Senator William M. Rainach of Claiborne Parish, former Lieutenant Governor Bill Dodd of Baton Rouge, former Governor James A. Noe of Monroe, and New Orleans Mayor deLesseps Story Morrison. Addison Roswell Thompson, the operator of a New Orleans taxicab stand and a member of the Ku Klux Klan, also filed candidacy papers.

Davis ran second in the primary to "Chep" Morrison, considered an anti-Long liberal by Louisiana standards. He defeated Morrison in the party runoff held on January 9, 1960. As African Americans (who had supported the Republican Party after the Civil War) were still largely disenfranchised in Louisiana, the Democratic primary was the only competitive race for office in the one-party state.

In the first round of balloting, Davis polled 213,551 (25.3 percent) to Morrison's 278,956 (33.1 percent). Rainach ran third with 143,095 (17 percent). Noe finished fourth with 97,654 (11.6 percent), and Dodd followed with 85,436 (10.1 percent). Davis won the northern and central parts of the state plus Baton Rouge, while Morrison dominated the southern portion of the state, particularly the French cultural parishes. In the runoff, Davis prevailed, 487,681 (54.1 percent) to Morrison's 414,110 (45.5 percent). It was estimated that Davis drew virtually all the Rainach support from the first primary.

Earl Long endorsed Davis in the runoff in part because he had a longstanding personal dislike of Morrison. Long's gubernatorial running-mate, James A. Noe, who finished fourth in the primary, stood with Morrison, as did the fifth-place gubernatorial candidate and former Long lieutenant governor, Bill Dodd.

Rainach and his unsuccessful candidate for state comptroller, later U.S. Representative Joe D. Waggonner, both endorsed Davis on the premise that Davis would be a stronger segregationist than Morrison. Davis had avoided segregationist rhetoric in the first primary race in 1959. According to Morrison, the singer had sought support from the NAACP in New Orleans and Lake Charles.

In the runoff with Morrison, Davis tried to identify as a more determined and dedicated segregationist than his rival. Morrison questioned Davis's change in campaign strategy and also appealed to segregationists. Morrison charged that Davis had "operated an integrated honky-tonk in California", when Davis was out of state with his singing career. Morrison also said that Davis had allowed the illegal operation of nine thousand slot machines when Davis was governor during the 1940s.

Meanwhile, Earl Long had run unsuccessfully for lieutenant governor in the first primary in 1959. There was a runoff between Morrison's choice for the job, Alexandria Mayor W. George Bowdon Jr., and Davis's selection, former state House Speaker Clarence C. "Taddy" Aycock of Franklin, St. Mary Parish. Aycock defeated Bowdon by a margin similar to the plurality of Davis over Morrison. The defeat was Long's second for lieutenant governor. He had lost in the 1944 primary to J. Emile Verret of Iberia Parish, who served in the second-ranking position in the first Davis administration.

Davis effectively used the slogan "He's One of Us" in the gubernatorial race. Number 6 on the ballot, he assembled an intraparty ticket for other statewide constitutional officers, including Aycock for lieutenant governor, Roy R. Theriot of Abbeville for comptroller, Douglas Fowler of Coushatta for custodian of voting machines, Jack P. F. Gremillion for attorney general, Dave L. Pearce, originally from West Carroll Parish, for agriculture commissioner, Ellen Bryan Moore for register of state lands, and Rufus D. Hayes for insurance commissioner; the latter four were all based in Baton Rouge. The entire Davis ticket was elected.

In their study The Louisiana Election of 1960, William C. Havard, Rudolf Heberle, and Perry H. Howard demonstrated that Davis built his second-primary victory by narrowly edging Morrison in the eastern and western extremities of south Louisiana. Davis secured the backing of organized labor and made inroads among the white, urban working class, which would have been essential to a Morrison victory. In the seven urban industrial parishes, which then comprised some 46.5 percent of the total turnout, Davis topped Morrison by 7,368 votes (50.8 percent) of the 419,537 applicable subtotal. 

Morrison polled 60 percent in his own Orleans Parish and 54.6 percent in adjacent suburban Jefferson Parish, but in the industrial strip and in more Protestant areas, Morrison slipped. The second primary attracted 57,744 more votes than the initial stage of balloting, and analysts found that the lion's share of additional ballots were filed by segregationists who backed Davis.

In the general election held on April 19, 1960, Davis defeated Republican Francis Grevemberg, a Lafayette native, by a margin of nearly 82–17 percent. Grevemberg had been head of the state police under Democratic Governor Robert F. Kennon and had gained a reputation for fighting organized crime. He called for a true two-party system for Louisiana. As the Democratic nominee in the nearly one-party state, Davis faced no serious political threat and did little campaigning against Grevemberg.

It has been reported that had General Curtis LeMay turned down George C. Wallace's offer to be his candidate for vice president in 1968 on the American Independent Party ticket, that Wallace was ready to announce Davis as his selection for vice president. Other sources say Wallace's second choice was the former governor of Arkansas, Orval Faubus.

Davis and Dodd
In the 1959 campaign, Bill Dodd had attacked Davis ferociously: it was part of Dodd's strategy to get Davis to withdraw from the primary. "Nothing personal in his [Dodd's] heart, just a cold-blooded plan to wind up in a second primary against Morrison, who he figured could not win against anyone [else] in a runoff," said Davis in the introduction to Dodd's memoirs, Peapatch Politics: The Earl Long Era in Louisiana Politics.

Dodd endorsed Morrison in the runoff, but he had a long-term reason for this decision. Dodd planned to run for school superintendent in the 1963 primary, and he wanted to have at least the neutrality of Morrison four years thereafter.

Dodd and Davis later became close friends. In Davis' words:

Bill and I have many things in common. We share the same type of religion and boyhood background; we got our start as schoolteachers and figured prominently in public education; we both served in public life at or near the top. And I like to feel that we share a common appreciation and respect for people, all people. One of the greatest rewards in politics is meeting people. And one of the greatest and most unusual men I've ever met is Bill Dodd.

Second term (1960–1964)
Davis' appointees in the second term included outgoing State Representative Claude Kirkpatrick of Jennings, who was named to succeed Lorris M. Wimberly as the Director of Public Works. In that capacity, Kirkpatrick took the steps for a joint agreement with Texas to establish the popular Toledo Bend Reservoir, a haven for boating and fishing. Mrs. Kirkpatrick, the former Edith Killgore, a native of Claiborne Parish, headed Davis' women's campaign division for southwestern Louisiana. He appointed Alexandria businessman Morgan W. Walker Sr. to the State Mineral Board. Walker founded a company which later became part of Continental Trailways Bus lines. Davis named as state highway director Ray Burgess of Baton Rouge, who considered running for governor in the 1963 primary.

As part of his support of segregation, Davis initiated passage of state legislation to create the Louisiana State Sovereignty Commission, which operated from 1960 to 1967. It "espoused states rights, anti-communist and segregationist ideas, with a particular focus on maintaining the status quo in race relations. It was closely allied with the Louisiana Joint Legislative Committee on Un-American Activities." It was modeled after Mississippi's commission, established in 1956 to resist integration. Davis tapped Frank Voelker Jr., City Attorney of Lake Providence, to chair the newly established Commission. It was given unusual  powers to investigate state citizens, and used its authority to exert economic pressure to suppress civil rights activists. Voelker left the commission in 1963 to run for governor but placed poorly in the primary; he withdrew and supported other candidates.

In his second term, Davis chose veteran Representative J. Thomas Jewell of New Roads in Pointe Coupee Parish as House Speaker to succeed Bob Angelle. Davis secured passage of a $60 million public improvements bond issue through the State Board and Building Commission, an organization controlled by the governor. He gained legislative support from many formerly pro-Long lawmakers and cemented his hold on the traditional anti-Long bloc. He avoided defeat on any legislation that he strongly supported and was able to defeat nearly all bills with which he did not concur.

He offered tacit support to Presidents John F. Kennedy and Lyndon B. Johnson, national Democrats, to secure the state's hold of pending offshore oil revenues. In the 1963 legislative fiscal session, he defeated efforts to procure an unpledged presidential elector slate for the 1964 general election, by which time he had been succeeded by John J. McKeithen.

Fourth place in 1971

In 1971, Davis entered another crowded Democratic gubernatorial primary field with new political prospects, but he finished in fourth place with 138,756 ballots (11.8 percent).

In a runoff election held in December 1971, U.S. Representative Edwin Washington Edwards of Crowley, Acadia Parish, defeated then state Senator J. Bennett Johnston Jr., of Shreveport for the party nomination. That vote was close: Edwards, 584,262 (50.2 percent) to Johnston's 579,774 (49.8 percent). Edwards beat Republican David C. Treen in the state general election held on February 1, 1972. By that time, Davis' days as a politician were clearly behind him.

Toward the end of his life, longtime Democrat Davis endorsed at least two Republican candidates after the state's voters had gone through a political realignment. In 1996 Davis endorsed Republican state representative Woody Jenkins of Baton Rouge for the U.S. Senate against Democrat Mary Landrieu of New Orleans, and Governor Murphy J. "Mike" Foster Jr. seeking re-election in 1999. His opponent was African-American Democratic Congressman Bill Jefferson of New Orleans.

Political legacy
Davis established a State Retirement System and funding of more than $100 million in public improvements, while leaving the state with a $38 million surplus after his first term.

During his second term, Davis built the Sunshine Bridge, the new Louisiana Governor's Mansion, and Toledo Bend Reservoir, all criticized at the time, but later recognized as beneficial to the state. Davis coordinated the pay periods of state employees, who had sometimes received their checks a week late, a particular hardship to those with low earnings.

Earl Long once remarked that Davis was so relaxed and low-key that one could not "wake up Jimmie Davis with an earthquake".

Public relations specialist Gus Weill, who worked in the Davis campaign in 1959, wrote a biography of the former governor in 1977, entitled You Are My Sunshine, based on Davis' best-known song.

Personal life

Davis's first wife, the former Alvern Adams, the daughter of a physician in Shreveport, was the first lady while he was governor during both terms. Two years after her death in 1967, Davis married Anna Gordon, born Effie Juanita Carter (February 15, 1917 – March 5, 2004). A founding member of the gospel quartet The Chuck Wagon Gang along with her father, a sister and a brother, she had been given the stage name "Anna" during the mid-1930s.  Davis was a longtime fan of the group, who were gospel music pioneers with more than 36 million records sold in forty years of affiliation with Columbia Records.

Out of office, Davis resided primarily in Baton Rouge but made numerous singing appearances, particularly in churches throughout the United States.

Davis died on November 5, 2000. He had suffered a fall in his home some ten months earlier and may have had a stroke in his last days. He is interred alongside his first wife at the Jimmie Davis Tabernacle Cemetery in his native Beech Springs community near Quitman. Jim Davis was cremated.

Davis was aged 101 years and 55 days, which made him the longest-lived of all U.S. state governors at the time of his death. Davis held this record until March 18, 2011, when Albert Rosellini of Washington achieved a greater lifespan of 101 years, 56 days.

Honors

The Jimmie Davis Bridge over the Red River connects Shreveport and Bossier City via Louisiana Highway 511. It was named in his honor during his second term as governor.

The Jimmie Davis Tabernacle is located near Weston in Jackson Parish. The tabernacle hosts occasional gospel singing. At the site is a replica of the Davis homestead (c. 1900) and of the Peckerwood Hill Store, an old general store that served the community.

Jimmie Davis State Park is located on Caney Lake (not to be confused with Caney Lakes Recreation Area near Minden) southwest of Chatham.

Davis was posthumously inducted into the Delta Music Museum Hall of Fame in Ferriday, Louisiana.

Davis was inducted into the Nashville Songwriters Hall of Fame in 1971, the Country Music Hall of Fame in 1972, the Southern Gospel Music Association Hall of Fame in 1997 and The Louisiana Music Hall of Fame in 2008.

In 1993, Davis was among the first thirteen inductees of the Louisiana Political Museum and Hall of Fame in Winnfield.

The Hall of Fame periodically issues the "Friends of Jimmie Davis Award". In 2005, the award was presented to then U.S. Senator Ted Stevens, an Alaska Republican, who once hosted Davis in a concert at the Kennedy Center in Washington, D.C. Speaking at the Louisiana Political Museum and Hall of Fame, Stevens recalled having been with both Davis and Ronald Reagan, when Reagan was contemplating his first run for governor of California and asked Davis for political advice. Stevens joined the Jimmie Davis Band in a rendition of "You Are My Sunshine".

The 2006 recipient of the "Friends of Jimmie Davis" award was the late former State Senator B. G. Dyess, a Baptist minister from Rapides Parish.
 
The Davis archives of papers and photographs is housed in the "You Are My Sunshine" Collection of the Linus A. Sims Memorial Library at Southeastern Louisiana University in Hammond.

Davis believed that his singing career enhanced his political prospects. He once told Georgia Republican Ronnie Thompson, a mayor of Macon and fellow musician: "If you want to have any success in politics, sing softly and carry a big guitar," a play on an old Theodore Roosevelt adage.

Filmography
Davis had several appearances in movies (usually or always as himself), including:
1942: Strictly in the Groove 
1942: Riding Through Nevada 
1943: Frontier Fury 
1944: Cyclone Prairie Rangers 
1947: Louisiana 
1949: Mississippi Rhythm 
1950: Square Dance Katy

See also

 List of governors of Louisiana
 Jim Flynn, a writer encouraged when Davis signed his first song writing contract

References

Sources
 Toru Mitsui (1998). "Jimmie Davis." In The Encyclopedia of Country Music. Paul Kingsbury, Ed. New York: Oxford University Press. p. 136.
 Kevin S. Fontenot, "You Can't Fight a Song: Country Music in Jimmie Davis' Gubernatorial Campaigns," Journal of Country Music (2007).

External links

 
 State of Louisiana Biography
 Cemetery Memorial by La-Cemeteries
 Listen to Jimmie singing "She's a Real Hum Dinger"
 Jimmie Davis recordings at the Discography of American Historical Recordings.
 at the Country Music Hall of Fame and Museum
 Jimmie Davis Collection and Jimmie Davis Photo Collection at Southeastern Louisiana University in Hammond.
Southern Gospel Music Association Hall of Fame and Museum

1899 births
2000 deaths
Educators from Louisiana
American actor-politicians
American male actors
American male singer-songwriters
Baptists from Louisiana
American centenarians
American country singer-songwriters
American gospel singers
Country Music Hall of Fame inductees
Democratic Party governors of Louisiana
Men centenarians
People from Jackson Parish, Louisiana
Politicians from Shreveport, Louisiana
Musicians from Baton Rouge, Louisiana
Louisiana Christian University alumni
Louisiana State University alumni
Louisiana Democrats
Members of the Louisiana Public Service Commission
20th-century American businesspeople
American male composers
20th-century American composers
American performers of Christian music
Southern gospel performers
Decca Records artists
Lawrence Welk
Politicians from Baton Rouge, Louisiana
Musicians from Shreveport, Louisiana
20th-century American singers
20th-century American politicians
Old Right (United States)
American anti-communists
20th-century American male singers
Singer-songwriters from Louisiana
Louisiana Dixiecrats